Giancarlo Raimondi (born 28 November 1972 in Milan) is an Italian former cyclist. He rode in one Giro d'Italia and four editions of the Vuelta a España.

Major results

1997
1st Stage 3 Vuelta a Asturias
1998
1st Stage 1 Volta a Portugal
3rd Giro del Friuli
 1st  Sprints Classification Vuelta a España
1999
1st Coppa Bernocchi
2000
1st Stage 2 Volta a Portugal
1st Stage 4 Four Days of Dunkirk

References

1972 births
Living people
Italian male cyclists
Cyclists from Milan